Convergence XXI, sometimes styled as Convergence 21, is a Galician political party. It describes itself as Galicianist, pro-European and liberal, the first party of this stripe in the country.

Views 
Converxencia XXI tries to provide solutions from a centrist point of view, which could help define the real needs of Galician society, which was plunged into a severe economic and social crisis around the time of the party's formation.

These solutions range from the creation of a solid inner infrastructure network supporting business, to the strategic projection of all Galician capitals. These measures are meant to oppose spoil systems and the persistent local-minded subsidiary mentality.

Converxencia XXI emphasises multilingualism, European integration and cultural opening. The final goal is to provide social conditions that can develop the maximum potential of all individuals.

History

Founded in May 2009 by its later elected First Secretary, Carlos Vázquez Padín, Converxencia XXI started contacts with other European organisations. The party entered into an early expansion stage, building up its militancy mostly via compromised citizens who share their ideological Liberal-Democrat and Reform basis.

The party achieved representation in the 2010 local elections, while concentrating on the largest Galician cities. For 2011 general elections, and for the first time in Spanish history, some parties were required to submit a minimum number of signatures to participate in elections. Converxencia XXI presented signatures and won the right to participate in all Galicia territory, having the best election result in its history and consolidating itself as the country's second Galician political force.

CXXI became the first centrist-Galicianist party to stand for all territories in a general election since 1991.

Achievements
The party's earliest achievements involved the foundation of the first internationally homologated Galician Think Tank, known as GALIDEM, within the European Liberal Forum. GALIDEM emphasises social research, economic studies and the knowledge society from a Liberal point of view. GALIDEM hosted the 2012 Iberian Liberal Encounter. The current First Secretary is known for his articles in several media over the Internet. These have been summarized into a single book, first published in early 2011.

References

External links 
 Converxencia XXI Official Web site
 Early report on El Pais journal
 Interview in Xornal de Galicia newspaper
 Interview in Vieiros newspaper
 Interview in A Peneira newspaper
 Interview in Portal Galego da Lingua (Galician Language WebSite)

Centrist parties in Spain
Political parties in Galicia (Spain)
Galician nationalism
Liberal parties in Spain
Political parties established in 2009
2009 establishments in Spain